Bobby Mackey's Music World is a nightclub and honky tonk located in Wilder, Kentucky, United States owned by country singer Bobby Mackey. Urban legends claim the nightclub is the site of hauntings, murders, and suicides; however, no credible evidence exists for such claims.

Folklore 
Promoted in popular culture as "the most haunted night club in America", Mackey claims the site was originally used as a slaughterhouse in the early 19th century and later torn down for construction of a roadhouse that took on various names, such as The Brisbane, until he purchased it in 1978. Various urban legends and modern folklore claim that the site features a "gateway to hell" and is haunted by spirits including Pearl Bryan, whose corpse was found in a field 2.5 miles from the site in Fort Thomas, Kentucky. Other legends claim Bryan's murderers were Satanists who cursed the location and vowed to haunt everyone involved in prosecuting the case. There is also a legend that claims a pregnant dancer named "Johanna" committed suicide with poison in the 1940s after her father murdered her lover Robert Randall, a singer at the club, by hanging him in the dressing room.

Investigations have failed to find public records of any such events, and research into property records, newspapers, and court files has failed to substantiate claims made regarding the history of the location. No connection between Bobby Mackey's and the Pearl Bryan murder has ever been established. According to science writer Sharon A. Hill, the nightclub is often publicized with tales of murders, curses, and hauntings, however "the current circulated legend has obviously enhanced and accrued additional details in the retelling over some 30+ years". Hill states that claims of supernatural activity and a "portal to hell" are completely unsubstantiated.

Haunting rumors and claims about Pearl Bryan are promoted in books such as Hell's Gate by Doug Hensley. Author Andrew Young speculates that such legends about Bryan are "a way to cope with the gruesome details of her death". According to the Campbell County Historical and Genealogical Society, the story of the murder of Pearl Bryan is continually exploited, and it is "highly unlikely" that her ghost haunts Bobby Mackey's Music World. Northern Kentucky Tribune reporter Ryan Clark investigated the rumors and took the $35 two-hour tour on two occasions, concluding, "there was nothing that happened on our tour that would indicate that Bobby Mackey’s was haunted".

Television shows 
 On December 13, 1991, Bobby Mackey, his wife Janet, and caretaker Carl Lawson were guests on The Jerry Springer Show.
 On October 30, 1992, Mackey, his wife, Lawson and others were guests on Geraldo Rivera.
 On November 28, 1995, episode 3 of  Haunted Lives: True Ghost Stories , which aired on UPN always featured 3 haunting stories; this episode included 'The Brotherhood', 'Ghost Watch' and 'The Headless Ghost'. The third, and final, story presented in the hour long episode highlighted Bobby Mackey's Music World and the paranormal happenings said to have occurred up until that point. Interviews with Mr. & Mrs. Mackey and  caretaker Carl Lawson with included statements by Doug Hensley (author of 'Hell's Gate' -a book about the bar itself) who had spent 5 years researching the club, regular bar patron, Richard Lawson, who was a key character in the story the episode presented and pychic and medium, Patricia Mischell, who had preformed a walk-through investigation of the establishment were also featured giving viewers the opportunity to hear reports via a first hand account. (The show was originally known as Real Ghost - although it can most often be found under its newer name - and was directed by Michael Levine and narrated by Stacy Keach. This specific episode featuring Seth Green.)
 A 2006 episode of the National Geographic Channel's documentary series Is It Real? featured the nightclub.
 The 2006 Discovery Channel's docudrama series A Haunting featured the nightclub.
 The 2008 premiere episode of the Travel Channel's ghost-hunting series Ghost Adventures featured interviews with former caretaker Carl Lawson, and author Douglas Hensley. The network later released a 3-part web series called Return to Bobby Mackey's, and the nightclub was featured again on the program in late 2010.
 On October 9, 2009, the nightclub was featured on Travel Channel's Most Terrifying Places in America.
 On November 16, 2011, the nightclub was featured on the SyFy program Ghost Hunters.
 The nightclub was featured on an episode of BuzzFeed Unsolved titled "The Ghosts and Demons of Bobby Mackey's"
 The nightclub was featured on the TV show, Paranormal Lockdown on Dec 11, 2018, season 3, episode 4, on the Destination America channel.
 The nightclub was featured on the TV show Portals to Hell on May 10, 2019, season 1, episode 3, on the Travel Channel.

Further reading

References

External links 
  of Bobby Mackey

Buildings and structures in Campbell County, Kentucky
Music venues in Kentucky
Tourist attractions in Campbell County, Kentucky
Reportedly haunted locations in Kentucky
Drinking establishments in Kentucky